Robert Farah may refer to:
Robert Farah (tennis) (born 1987), Colombian professional tennis player
Robbie Farah (born 1984), Australian professional rugby league player